Paul S. Atkins is CEO of Patomak Global Partners LLC, which provides consulting services regarding financial services industry matters, including regulatory compliance, risk and crisis management, public affairs, independent reviews, litigation support, and strategy.  He also serves as an independent director and non-executive chairman of the board of BATS Global Markets, Inc., a leading operator of electronic U.S. and European securities markets trading listed cash equity securities and equity options.

Early life and education
Originally from Lillington, North Carolina, Atkins grew up in Tampa, Florida. He received his A.B. from Wofford College in 1980 and was a member of Phi Beta Kappa and Kappa Alpha Order.

Atkins received his J.D. from Vanderbilt University School of Law in 1983 and was Senior Student Writing Editor of the Vanderbilt Law Review.

Career
Atkins began his career as a lawyer in New York City with Davis Polk & Wardwell, focusing on a wide range of corporate transactions for U.S. and foreign clients, including public and private securities offerings and mergers and acquisitions. He was resident for 2½ years in his firm's Paris office and admitted as conseil juridique in France in 1988.

Before his appointment as commissioner, Atkins assisted financial services firms in improving their compliance with SEC regulations and worked with law enforcement agencies to investigate and rectify situations where investors had been harmed. Most prominent among these situations was Bennett Funding Group, Inc., a $1 billion leasing company that perpetrated the then-largest "Ponzi" fraud to date in U.S. history. More than 20,000 investors lost much of their investment. Assisting the company's court-appointed bankruptcy trustee, Atkins served as crisis president of Bennett's sole surviving subsidiary, according to his SEC biography. By stabilizing its finances and operations and rebuilding and expanding its business, he improved its share value for the remaining investors by almost 2000%.

From 1990 to 1994, Atkins served on the staff of two former chairmen of the SEC, Richard C. Breeden and Arthur Levitt. Under Chairman Breeden, he assisted in efforts to improve regulations regarding corporate governance, enhance shareholder communications, strengthen management accountability through proxy reform, and decrease barriers to entry for small businesses and middle market companies to the capital markets. Under Chairman Levitt, he was responsible for organizing the SEC's individual investor program, including the first investor town hall meetings, and an SEC consumer affairs advisory committee. 
      
Atkins was a commissioner of the U.S. Securities and Exchange Commission (SEC) from July 9, 2002 until his term's completion in August 2008. He served with chairmen Harvey Pitt, William H. Donaldson, and Christopher Cox.

In December 2016, Atkins joined a business forum assembled by President-Elect Trump to provide strategic and policy advice on economic issues.

Personal
Atkins is married with three sons.

References

See also
Late-2000s financial crisis

Living people
Members of the U.S. Securities and Exchange Commission
Vanderbilt University Law School alumni
Wofford College alumni
Davis Polk & Wardwell lawyers
People from Lillington, North Carolina
1950s births
George W. Bush administration personnel